"Shh" is the sixth Japanese single from South Korean girl group After School. The single was released on January 29, 2014. The track is produced by Shinichi Osawa, who previously produced their fifth Japanese single "Heaven". It was the last Japanese single with Lee Jooyeon before she graduated in December 2014.

Background
Following the release of their fifth Japanese single, the group announced that they would be releasing a new single at the beginning of the new year. The single is to be released in three versions: CD only edition (Type C), CD & DVD edition (Type A) and CD & Photobook (Type B) edition. There is also a mu-mo exclusive CD package, which includes 8 solo jackets for the single.
The covers were revealed on December 20, 2013 and it showed After School dressing masculine, with all photos in black and white.

Music video
A teaser for the music video was published on December 15, 2013 by Avex Trax which previewed the concept and a short snippet of the title track. The full music video for "Shh" was exclusively aired on MTV Japan on December 17, 2013 before being published on Avex Trax's official YouTube page three days later. The music video showcases the girls in a masculine concept, with the music video being in all black and white.

Track listing

Chart performance

Oricon chart

Billboard charts

Release history

References

2014 singles
2014 songs
Avex Trax singles
After School (band) songs
Songs written by Shinichi Osawa
Torch songs
Hybe Corporation singles